Klickitat Glacier is located on the east slopes of Mount Adams a stratovolcano in the U.S. state of Washington. Though within the Mount Adams Wilderness, the glacier is situated within the boundaries of the Yakama Indian Reservation. Klickitat Glacier has been in a general state of retreat for over 100 years and lost 46 percent of its surface area between 1904 and 2006.

See also 
List of glaciers in the United States

References 

Glaciers of Mount Adams (Washington)
Mount Adams (Washington)
Gifford Pinchot National Forest
Glaciers of Yakima County, Washington
Glaciers of Washington (state)